Shadeyka is a rural locality (a settlement) and the administrative center of Shadeyskoye Rural Settlement, Kungursky District, Perm Krai, Russia. The population was 1,205 as of 2010. There are 16 streets.

Geography 
Shadeyka is located 14km northwest of Kungur (the district's administrative centre) by road. Ludino is the nearest rural locality.

References 

Rural localities in Perm Krai